The 2022 Adelaide International 2 was a tennis tournament on the 2022 ATP Tour and 2022 WTA Tour. It was a combined ATP Tour 250 and WTA 250 tournament played on outdoor hard courts at the Memorial Drive Tennis Centre in Adelaide, South Australia, Australia. This was the fourth edition of the tournament for the women and the third edition for the men.

It was organized due to the cancellation of the Hobart International for the women and ATP Auckland Open for the men, because of the ongoing COVID-19 pandemic. The tournament took place from 10 to 15 January 2022 and followed the 2022 Adelaide International 1, a combined ATP Tour 250 and WTA 500 tournament, held the week before.

Champions

Men's singles 

  Thanasi Kokkinakis def.  Arthur Rinderknech 6–7(6–8), 7–6(7–5), 6–3

Women's singles 

  Madison Keys def.  Alison Riske 6–1, 6–2

Men's doubles 

  Wesley Koolhof /  Neal Skupski def.  Ariel Behar /  Gonzalo Escobar, 7–6(7–5), 6–4

Women's doubles 

  Eri Hozumi /  Makoto Ninomiya def.  Tereza Martincová /  Markéta Vondroušová 1–6, 7–6(7–4), [10–7]

Points and prize money

Point distribution

*per team

Prize money

ATP singles main-draw entrants

Seeds

 1 Rankings are as of 3 January 2022.

Other entrants 
The following players received wildcards into the singles main draw:
  Alex Bolt 
  Thanasi Kokkinakis
  Aleksandar Vukic

The following players received entry from the qualifying draw:
  Egor Gerasimov
  Steve Johnson
  Corentin Moutet
  Yoshihito Nishioka

The following players received entry as lucky losers:
  Roberto Carballés Baena
  Thiago Monteiro

Withdrawals
Before the tournament
  Jenson Brooksby → replaced by  Arthur Rinderknech
  Laslo Đere → replaced by  Thiago Monteiro
  James Duckworth → replaced by  Jaume Munar
  Dominik Koepfer → replaced by  Roberto Carballés Baena
  Sebastian Korda → replaced by  Gianluca Mager

ATP doubles main-draw entrants

Seeds

 1 Rankings are as of 3 January 2022.

Other entrants
The following pairs received wildcards into the doubles main draw:
  Aaron Addison /  Thomas Fancutt 
  Harry Bourchier /  Brandon Walkin

The following pair received entry as alternates:
  Calum Puttergill /  Adam Taylor

Withdrawals 
Before the tournament
  Romain Arneodo /  Benoît Paire → replaced by  Oscar Otte /  Benoît Paire
  Márton Fucsovics /  Tommy Paul → replaced by  Calum Puttergill /  Adam Taylor
  Tallon Griekspoor /  Andrea Vavassori → replaced by  Treat Huey /  Frederik Nielsen
  Nicolas Mahut /  Fabrice Martin → replaced by  Evan King /  Alex Lawson
  Frances Tiafoe /  Nicholas Monroe → replaced by  Nicholas Monroe /  Holger Rune

WTA singles main-draw entrants

Seeds 

 1 Rankings are as of 3 January 2022.

Other entrants 
The following players received wildcards into the singles main draw:
  Maddison Inglis 
  Aryna Sabalenka 
  Daria Saville

The following player received entry as an alternate:
  Ana Konjuh

The following players received entry from the qualifying draw:
  Lauren Davis
  Rebecca Peterson
  Anastasia Potapova
  Dayana Yastremska
  Heather Watson
  Storm Sanders

The following player received entry as a lucky loser:
  Danka Kovinić

Withdrawals 
Before the tournament
  Camila Giorgi → replaced by  Madison Brengle
  Veronika Kudermetova → replaced by  Danka Kovinić
  Ann Li → replaced by  Ana Konjuh
  Yulia Putintseva → replaced by  Madison Keys
  Sara Sorribes Tormo → replaced by  Mayar Sherif
  Clara Tauson → replaced by  Alizé Cornet

WTA doubles main-draw entrants

Seeds 

 1 Rankings are as of 3 January 2022.

Other entrants
The following pairs received wildcards into the doubles main draw:
  Maddison Inglis /  Olivia Tjandramulia 
  Annerly Poulos /  Tina Nadine Smith

The following pair received entry as an alternate:
  Kristína Kučová /  Tara Moore

Withdrawals
Before the tournament
  Marie Bouzková /  Lucie Hradecká → replaced by  Kristína Kučová /  Tara Moore
  Chan Hao-ching /  Monica Niculescu → replaced by  Peangtarn Plipuech /  Aldila Sutjiadi
  Katarzyna Piter /  Renata Voráčová → replaced by  Marta Kostyuk /  Katarzyna Piter

See also

 South Australian Championships 
 Australian Hard Court Championships
 Australian Open Series

References

External links
 
 ATP tournament Official website
 WTA tournament Official website

2022 Adelaide International
2022 ATP Tour
2022 WTA Tour
Adel
January 2022 sports events in Australia